Big John Wrencher (February 12, 1923 – July 15, 1977), also known as One Arm John, was an American blues harmonica player and singer, well known for playing at the Maxwell Street Market in Chicago in the 1960s. He toured Europe in the 1970s.

Biography
John Thomas Wrencher was born in Sunflower, Mississippi, United States. He became interested in music as a child and taught himself to play the harmonica at an early age. Beginning in the early 1940s, he worked as an itinerant musician in Tennessee, Missouri, Indiana, and Illinois.  By the mid-1940s he had arrived in Chicago and was playing on Maxwell Street and at house parties with Jimmy Rogers, Claude "Blue Smitty" Smith and John Henry Barbee. In the 1950s he moved to Detroit, where he worked with the singer and guitarist Baby Boy Warren and formed his own trio, which performed in the Detroit area and in Clarksdale, Mississippi.

In 1958 Wrencher lost his left arm as a result of a car accident outside Memphis, Tennessee.  By the early 1960s he had settled in Chicago, where he became a fixture on Maxwell Street Market, in particular playing from 10 a.m. to 3 p.m. on Sundays. In 1964 he appeared in a documentary film about Maxwell Street, entitled And This Is Free; performances by Wrencher recorded in the process of making the film were eventually included on a three-CD set, And This Is Maxwell Street. During the 1960s he recorded for the Testament label backing Robert Nighthawk and as part of the Chicago String Band. In 1969 he recorded for Barrelhouse Records, backed by the guitarist Little Buddy Thomas and the drummer Playboy Vinson, who formed his Maxwell Street band at that time. The resulting album, Maxwell Street Alley Blues, was described as "superlative in every regard" by Cub Koda, writing for AllMusic. Wrencher toured Europe with the Chicago Blues Festival in 1973 and with the American Blues Legends in 1974. On the latter tour he recorded an album in London for Big Bear Records, backed by the guitarist Eddie Taylor and his band.

During a trip to Mississippi to visit his family in July 1977, Wrencher died suddenly of a heart attack in Wade Walton's barbershop in Clarksdale, Mississippi.

Discography

Albums recorded as leader

Collaboration albums

Albums recorded as sideman

Compilations

Anthologies

References

External links
 Illustrated Big John Wrencher discography

1923 births
1977 deaths
American blues harmonica players
Harmonica blues musicians
American blues singers
Blues musicians from Mississippi
American street performers
People from Sunflower, Mississippi
JSP Records artists
P-Vine Records artists
20th-century African-American male singers